Catherine Daoust is a Canadian ice hockey defender, currently signed with the Montreal Force of the Premier Hockey Federation.

Career 
Daoust won a $1,500 scholarship from the NHL's Montreal Canadiens in 2013.

From 2014 to 2018, Daoust played and studied at the University of Minnesota Duluth, putting up 37 points in 140 NCAA games. She was named to the WCHA All-Academic Team in both 2016 and 2017, and served as an assistant captain for Minnesota-Duluth in her senior year.

She was drafted 28th overall by Les Canadiennes de Montréal in the 2018 CWHL Draft. After graduating, she signed her first professional contract with the club, scoring 5 points in 27 games in her rookie CWHL season. She scored her first goal in her second game, a 9–0 victory over the Worcester Blades.

After the collapse of the CWHL in May 2019, she joined the PWHPA. She played for Team Knox at the Unifor Showcase in September 2019.

International 
She represented Team Canada at the 2013 IIHF World Women's U18 Championship, scoring 3 points in 5 games as the country won gold.

Personal life 
Daoust attended Cégep de Saint-Laurent. She has a bachelor's degree in mechanical engineering. Her boyfriend has launched the Until She’s Paid platform, aiming to profile women's hockey players and to petition the NHL to fund women's hockey.

References

External links

1995 births
Living people
Professional Women's Hockey Players Association players
Les Canadiennes de Montreal players
Canadian women engineers
Ice hockey people from Montreal
People from L'Île-Bizard–Sainte-Geneviève
Minnesota Duluth Bulldogs women's ice hockey players
Montreal Force players
Canadian women's ice hockey defencemen